WayRay  is a deep-tech company with offices in Switzerland, United States, China, Hong Kong, and Germany. It develops holographic AR technologies for connected cars. WayRay's in-house R&D center and prototyping facilities create holographic optical systems, complex mechanics, electronics, and software.

History 
According to Vitaly Ponomarev, company's founder, the idea of a device that projects navigational information on the windshield of the car came to him after the accident into which he got when he was distracted by the GPS navigator. The concept was gradually supplemented by the Internet connection,  mechanics of the social network and augmented reality. By December 2011, the idea became a project of a portable collimator to install on a car's front panel. Using a thin holographic film on the windshield instead of a mirror system made it possible to reduce the dimensions of the device. In the spring of 2012, the device was presented for the first time.

In October 2013, WayRay took the prize at the Intel Global Challenge, UC Berkeley, California, and the following month got shortlisted as a finalist at Slush, a startup competition in Helsinki, Finland.

In 2015, L’Hebdo, a weekly French-language news magazine in Switzerland, listed Ponomarev among 100 outstanding innovators of Switzerland. In November 2017, at the LA Auto Show, WayRay was selected as the grand prize winner of the 2017 Top Ten Automotive Startups Competition.

WayRay's achievements have been covered by various media: in 2013, Business Insider magazine listed WayRay among the 11 Hottest Startups in Northern Europe; in 2017, Wired magazine included WayRay in the Top 10 Startups Racing to Remake The Auto Industry. Later in 2018, VentureBeat named the company one of “7 promising tech startups shaking up the auto industry.”

Investments 
Initial capital of WayRay was 300,000 USD of personal and borrowed funds of the founder, which was aimed at designing electronics and developing a chemical formula of the film, later ordered at DuPont. 
In 2017, the Chinese internet giant Alibaba Group led an $18 million Series B round. In September 2018, the company raised another $80 million in Series C round led by Porsche. As of then, WayRay had a valuation of $500 million.

Developments 

The company is inventing and mastering the technology for creating an augmented reality experience for the automotive industry :

 Deep Reality Display — Deep Reality Display technology — a new generation of the WayRay True AR HUD where different parts of the virtual image can appear at different distances.
 Holograktor — a ride-sharing concept car from Swiss deep-tech firm WayRay with its world-first Real AR holographic head-up display. The WayRay Holograktor EV runs three separate “Real Augmented Reality” holographic displays, with one for each of its three occupants, blended in seamlessly from ranges of zero to infinity.
 True AR SDK — an augmented reality development framework for third-party developers which allows building AR apps for cars. These are the apps that run on holographic AR displays and complement the native AR interface. AR app content consists of virtual objects seamlessly integrated into the world around the car. The company plans to distribute the developed applications through its own AR marketplace.

In November 2017 WayRay won the grand prize in the Top Ten Automotive Startups Competition at LA Auto Show. In addition to the prize money, the company was granted other perks from companies represented among panel judges. Those perks included access to Microsoft Azure cloud infrastructure, a new Nvidia Drive PX 2 AI computer and access to Elektrobit's software network for automated driving and consulting services from Porsche Consulting.

In January 2018, the CES-2018 company showed off its Navion navigation system for the first time. Also at CES, WayRay demonstrated its development platform True AR SDK, which is created to allow others to build augmented reality apps for automobiles. In February 2018, the company has announced a new competition seeking developers for its True SDK Challenge, a competition to create AR applications for cars.

In November 2021 WayRay launched its own Holograktor car to showcase the holographic technology, which would replace existing head-up displays.

Automotive collaborations 
WayRay's business model includes both retail sales Navion Navigator and concluding OEM-contracts with automakers on the supply of AR-system. In December 2015, the company announced a partnership agreement with the French provider of telecommunications services, Orange Business Services, under which it will provide wireless connection and maintenance of WayRay products in the US.

In January 2017, at the CES-2017 Consumer Electronics Show in Las Vegas, the company announced a strategic partnership with the US automotive electronics manufacturer Harman International Industries and the planned introduction of WayRay technologies into Harman's solutions for automakers. The autonomous concept car Oasis of the Swiss company Rinspeed was presented at the exhibition. It is equipped with the infotainment system with augmented reality developed by WayRay.

Banma Technologies, a joint venture between Alibaba Group and Chinese auto concern SAIC Motor, is a WayRay's partner which works with carmakers on its behalf. Pilot implementation of the system is planned in one of the production cars.

At Startup Autobahn 2018, Europe's largest innovation platform initiated by Daimler AG and Plug and Play, WayRay announced its joint pilot project with the German automobile manufacturer Porsche and took home the People's Choice Award and the prize in the AR/VR category. The company also cooperates with a number of automakers on several future vehicles, which will be presented in 2019 and subsequent years.

References

Links 
 

Augmented reality